Brighton Tonderai Watambwa (born 9 June 1977) is a Zimbabwean cricketer who in 2014 captained the Belgium national cricket team.

A right-arm fast-medium bowler, Watambwa played six Tests for Zimbabwe between April 2001 and March 2002, taking 14 wickets. Domestically, he alternated between playing for Mashonaland and Mashonaland A.

Following a contract dispute with the Zimbabwe Cricket Union, Watambwa emigrated to the USA in the autumn of 2002. After obtaining a degree from the University of Miami, he moved to Belgium in 2009, taking on a full-time job with Johnson & Johnson in Brussels until 2015.

References

1977 births
Living people
Alumni of Falcon College
University of Miami alumni
Mashonaland cricketers
Mashonaland A cricketers
Zimbabwe Test cricketers
Zimbabwean cricketers